Tesauro is a surname, and may refer to:

 Bernardo Tesauro, Italian painter
 Emanuele Tesauro (1592–1675) rhetorician, dramatist, poet, and historian from Turin
 Filippo Tesauro, Italian painter
 Giuseppe Tesauro (1942–2021), Italian judge
 Michelle Tesauro, American reality show contestant
 Raimo Epifanio Tesauro, Italian painter